American Conference may refer to:

American Conference of Governmental Industrial Hygienists, professional organization in the field of industrial hygiene
American Unitarian Conference, a religious organization founded in 2000 by Unitarian Universalists
Pan-American Conference, an international trade summit held in Bogotá, Colombia in 1948
In school sports:
American Conference (CIF), a California high-school organization
American Athletic Conference, an NCAA Division I conference reorganized in 2013 from the former Big East Conference
In professional American football:
American Football Conference (AFC) of the National Football League
American Conference of the Arena Football League
All-America Football Conference, a league which played from 1946 to 1949